Bhaiyya Ganpatrao, alias "Sughar-piya", (1852–1920) was a member of the Gwalior royal family and known for pioneering the harmonium as an accompanying instrument. He was a member of the Gwalior gharana school of classical music.

Background
Bhaiyya Ganpatrao was born to Jayajirao Scindia of the Gwalior princely family. He was the brother of Jiwajirao Scindia.

Music training
He studied with Sadiq Ali Khan of Kirana Gharana and later with Bande Ali Khan and Inayat Hussain Khan, both students of Haddu Khan of Gwalior Gharana.

Legacy
In the late-19th Century and early-20th Century, Ganpatrao was the "greatest name" associated with the harmonium. He popularized the instrument and developed its Thumri-ang.

Like Govindrao Tembe, Ganpatrao is credited with establishing harmonium as an instrument for Hindustani Classical music. Consequently, he had an enormous impact on many musicians whom he taught.

Compositions
Ganpatrao was a prolific composer and used the mudra "Sughar-piya."

Influence
Faiyaz Khan began singing thumris publicly because of Ganptrao's influence. Bismillah Khan adopted some of Ganpatrao's techniques to his Shehnai-playing.

Students
The sarod maestro Hafiz Ali Khan, father of Amjad Ali Khan, learned dhrupad and thumri from Ganpatrao. He also taught Bashir Khan of Indore and Girija Shankar Chakrabarty.

He also taught Jaddanbai, the mother of Bollywood actress Nargis.

References

Gwalior culture
Gwalior gharana
Hindustani singers
Singers from Maharashtra
Indian Hindus
People from Sindhudurg district
Marathi-language singers
1852 births
1920 deaths
19th-century Indian male classical singers